The Bum La Pass is a border pass between  China's Tsona County in Tibet and India's Tawang district in Arunachal Pradesh. It is 37 km away from the town of Tawang in India's Tawang district and 43 km from the town of Tsona Dzong in China’s Tsona County. The pass currently serves as a trading point between Arunachal Pradesh and Tibet. It is also an agreed Border Personnel Meeting point for the security forces of China and India.

Location
An old traders road went from Tawang via Milakatong La Pass ("La" in the Tibetan Language means "pass") to Bum La Pass and finally to Tsona Dzong in Tibet.

History

1962 Sino-Indian War

The road to Bum La is also a historical route, the People's Liberation Army of China invaded India during the 1962 Sino-Indian War. Here in Bum La Pass one of the fiercest battle took place in the 1962 Sino-Indian War.

Opening of Trade Route in 2006

In 2006, Bumla pass was re-opened to traders for the first time in 44 years. Traders from both sides of the pass were permitted to enter each other's territories, in addition to postal workers from each country.

Climate

It is often covered with heavy snow throughout the year.  It is one of the most off-beat passes in the world.

Tourism
Visit by civilian tourist of India is permissible with permission from the Indian Army. The track is very treacherous, only SUVs advisable, and that too only on clear weather day with no snowfall or rainfall.

Sangestar Tso

Created by falling rocks, boulders and trees in an earthquake, there is a Sangestar Tso lake (lake is called Tso in Tibetan) that featured Madhuri Dixit (Bollywood actress) in the movie Koyla, as a result this lake is sometimes also called Madhuri lake. The lake is about 20 km from Tawang town, about 7 km beyond the bifurcation of road leading to Bum La Pass.

Heap of Stones Monument

There is a Heap of Stones here where visitors place pebbles as gratitude to the mighty Himalayas and the guardians of our northern frontiers. There is a Sino-India friendship sign here.

Indo-China Border Personnel Meeting (BPM) point

It is one of the five officially agreed Border Personnel Meeting points between the Indian Army and the People's Liberation Army of China for regular consultations and interactions between the two armies to improve relations.

Here, there is a hut on the India side where border meetings are held by the rival armies.

Permit
A special permit is required to visit Bum La Pass. The Permits can be requested at the Office of the Deputy Commissioner in Tawang District, and the same has to be stamped in the Indian army cantonment of Tawang. Without the army stamp, visitors will not be allowed through the numerous check posts on the way.

See also 
 Chumi Gyatse Falls
 Tawang Monastery
 Tawang district
 2022 Yangtse clash

References

External links 
 

China–India border crossings
Mountain passes of Arunachal Pradesh
Mountain passes of Tibet
Mountain passes of China
Mountain passes of India
Mountain passes of the Himalayas
Borders of Arunachal Pradesh